Kinyerezi is an administrative ward in the Ilala District of the Dar es Salaam Region of Tanzania. In 2016 the Tanzania National Bureau of Statistics report there were 13,982 people in the ward, from 38,366 in 2012.

References

Ilala District
wards of Dar es Salaam Region